Agassiziella albidivisa is a moth in the family Crambidae. It is found in India (the Khasi Hills).

References

Acentropinae
Moths of Asia
Moths described in 1896